The Flea may refer to:

The Flea (poem) by the metaphysical poet John Donne
The Flea (online poetry journal)
The Flea (fairy tale), a fairy tale by Giambattista Basile
The Flea (horse) (1846–1856), British thoroughbred racehorse
The Flea (character), a character from the TV show ¡Mucha Lucha!
The Flea 88.2, a radio station based in Devonport, Auckland, New Zealand